The 2008 Baylor Bears football team represented Baylor University in the 2008 NCAA Division I FBS football season. The team was led by head coach Art Briles in his first year in the position. They played their home games at Floyd Casey Stadium in Waco, Texas.

Preseason
Two Baylor players, linebacker Joe Pawelek and defensive back Jordan Lake, made the preseason All-Big 12 team. Pawelek made at least 86 tackles in each of the previous two seasons, while Lake posted 120 tackles, two interceptions, forced two fumbles, and recovered two in 2007. Lake was Baylor's only all-Big 12 postseason selection in 2007.

The Bears returned 15 starters, including 9 on offense, and 6 on defense.

In their preseason countdown, Rivals.com ranked the Bears' 2008 squad 92nd out of all 120 Division I FBS teams. The official Big 12 media preseason poll picked the Bears to finish last in the Big 12 South.

Coaching staff
 Art Briles — Head Coach
 Randy Clements — Co-Offensive Coordinator (Line)
 Philip Montgomery — Co-Offensive Coordinator (QBs & RBs)
 Brian Norwood — Defensive Coordinator
 Chris Achuff — Assistant Coach (Defensive tackles)
 Dino Babers — Assistant Coach (WR)/Recruiting Coordinator
 Kendal Briles — Assistant Coach (Receivers)
 Larry Hoefer — Assistant Coach (Linebackers)
 Kaz Kazadi — Head Strength Coach
 Kim McCloud — Assistant Coach (Cornerbacks)
 Theo Young — Assistant Coach (Defensive ends)

Schedule

Game summaries

Washington State

Postseason
Three Baylor players—Jason Smith, Jordan Lake, and Joe Pawelek—made the All-Big 12 first team. Derek Epperson and Dan Gay received honorable mention, while Robert Griffin III was named Offensive Freshman of the Year. Griffin became Baylor's second Big 12 individual award winner, joining Daniel Sepulveda, who won Big 12 Special Teams Player of the Year in 2006.

References

Baylor
Baylor Bears football seasons
Baylor Bears football